Nafeesa is an Arabic and Persian feminine name. Nafees is the masculine equivalent and also used for family names.

Nafeesa may refer to:

Nafeesa Ali (alternatively Nafisa Ali) (born 1957), Indian actress and social activist

See also